Perssoniella vitreocincta is the only species of liverwort in the monotypic genus Perssoniella and family Perssoniellaceae. It is endemic to New Caledonia. 

The genus name of Perssoniella is in honour of Nathan Petter Herman Persson (1893–1978), who was a Swedish doctor and botanist (Bryology), who worked as curator in the Herbarium of Gothenburg Botanical Garden. 

The genus was circumscribed by Theodor Carl Julius Herzog in Ark. Bot. series 2, vol.2 on pages 168 and 265 in 1952.

Its natural habitat is subtropical or tropical dry forests.

References

External links

Jungermanniales
Monotypic bryophyte genera
Endemic flora of New Caledonia
Vulnerable plants
Taxonomy articles created by Polbot
Jungermanniales genera